Hon. Jemma Nunu Kumba (born 1966) is a South Sudanese politician. She is the current Minister of Gender, Child and Social Welfare of South Sudan. She founded the Sudan women Parliamentary Caucus in 2004 at the start of the comprehensive peace agreement.  She was chosen by the SPLM as the speaker of the Revitalised Transitional National Legislative Assembly (R-TNLA). She became the first woman to preside over the parliament of South Sudan.

Early life 
Jemma Nunu Kumba was born in Tombura County of Western Equatoria. During her childhood, she moved from Tombura County to a refugee camp in Central Africa. She later attended secondary school at Juba Day in Juba from 1983 to 1986 in Juba. In 1991, Comrade Jemma left Khartoum and effectively joined her husband in Kidepo Valley, one of the SPLM/A liberated areas by then.

Career 
In the 1990s, Kumba worked as administrator of a company with ties to the Sudan People's Liberation Army (SPLA) and then as a coordinator for the New Sudan Council of Churches. When her husband was appointed Sudan People's Liberation Movement (SPLM) representative to Namibia, Kumba moved with him. While in Namibia she enrolled at the University of Namibia, studying Economics and Management Science,  and graduated with Bachelors Degree in Public Administration and Political science from 1999 to 2002. In 2002, she participated in peace talks on behalf of SPLM in Kenya. After the Comprehensive Peace Agreement (CPA) in 2005, she served as a member of parliament in Khartoum. Kumba is a member of the SPLM party.

Kumba was the first woman to serve as governor after the CPA. She was appointed Governor of the Western Equatoria State in 2008. She lost the April 2010 election for governor to Bangassi Joseph Mario Bakosoro.

In June 2010, she was appointed as GOSS Minister of Housing and physical planning. On 26 August 2011 Hon. Jemma Nunu  was reappointed the Minister for Housing and Physical Planning in the Cabinet of South Sudan. On January 9 2012, Hon. Jemmac  was appointed as a member of the National Constitution Review Commission (NCRC). On 3 August 2013, President of South Sudan Salva Kiir Mayardit  shuffled several ministers and deputies, moving Kumba to Minister of Electricity, Dams, Irrigation & Water Resources. By July 2016 she was Minister of Wildlife Conservation and Tourism.

In October 2015, President Kiir Mayardit, appointed Kumba to serve as deputy secretary general of SPLM. At the same time, Salva Kiir dissolved national secretariats and tasked Kumba with recommending new party secretariats. She replaced Anne Itto Leonardo in the position of deputy secretary general of SPLM. Kumba was sworn in on 13 November 2015.

Commrade Jemma Nunu Kumba was appointed Minister of Gender, Child and Social Welfare in 2018. After the signing of the R-ARCSS, in 2019 Comrade Jemma was appointed as the Minister of Parliamentary Affairs.

On 23  July 2021 Hon. Jemma was nominated by the SPLM Leaderships as SPLM Candidate for the position of Speaker of the Revitalized Transitional National Legislative Assembly.

Personal life 
She is married to Festo Kumba, the former minister of Animal Resources and Fisheries. The couple has four children.

See also
 SPLM
 SPLA

References

External links
Website of Government of South Sudan

Living people
Speakers of the National Legislative Assembly (South Sudan)
Sudan People's Liberation Movement politicians
Government ministers of South Sudan
21st-century South Sudanese women politicians
21st-century South Sudanese politicians
Women government ministers of South Sudan
1966 births
People from Western Equatoria
University of Namibia alumni